Football League Extra is an English Football League highlights show supplied by ITV Sport. It usually aired late on Monday nights. The programme first aired in 1994, and ended after the 2003–2004 season, when it was to be replaced on Sunday mornings with The Championship. The show was first presented by Gabriel Clarke – other presenters later included Dave Beckett, Matt Smith and Tom Skippings. The show ran many club-specific features and also featured competitions and archive footage. Throughout the years, there often featured a Friday/Sunday or Monday extra which showed extended highlights of certain games. Football League Extra disbanded for a time in 2002 after the ITV Digital collapse, but soon returned to ITV during the 2002–2003 season. The theme in the first 2 seasons was the ITV Euro 92 theme You Are The Number One the shows other theme tune was called "Little Britain" by Dreadzone. Other songs included "July" by Ocean Colour Scene and "Whoosh" by Bentley Rhythm Ace.

Commentators and Reporters
Commentators and reporters on Football League Extra included Clive Tyldesley, Alistair Mann, Tony Jones, Peter Drury, Ian Payne, Trevor Harris, Ron Atkinson, Dave Beckett and more. The show also included resident club commentators, and this often provided entertainment as the viewer would be able to hear ecstatic celebrations at times.

References

ITV (TV network) original programming
ITV Sport
English Football League on television
1994 British television series debuts
2004 British television series endings
1990s British sports television series
2000s British sports television series